Polina Ivanovna Monova (born 6 April 1993) is a Russian former professional tennis player.

She has a career-high singles ranking of world No. 160, achieved on 19 June 2017. On 18 December 2017, she peaked at No. 118 in the doubles rankings. In her career, Monova won nine singles and 28 doubles titles on the ITF Circuit.

She made her WTA Tour main-draw debut at the 2015 Baku Cup in the doubles event, partnering Ksenia Lykina.

ITF Circuit finals

Singles: 12 (9 titles, 3 runner-ups)

Doubles: 48 (28 titles, 20 runner-ups)

External links
 
 

Russian female tennis players
1993 births
Living people
Sportspeople from Ufa
21st-century Russian women
20th-century Russian women